Maccabi Health Services (Hebrew: מכבי שירותי בריאות, formerly Maccabi Fund for the Ill, Hebrew: קופת חולים מכבי), known as Kupat Holim Maccabi, is one of the four Health Maintenance Organizations (HMOs) currently active in Israel. It was founded in September 1940 and began operating in August 1941. Since 1995 Maccabi has been operating under the National Health Insurance Law. Membership fees for HMOs in Israel are legally determined and are collected from those entitled to membership by the Institute for National Insurance.

Maccabi’s services are based upon the Israeli National Health Services Basket and the Maccabi Services Basket. Maccabi members can benefit from additional paid coverage through the Additional Health Services. Maccabi has three levels of Additional Health Services on offer: Maccabi Silver, Maccabi Gold, and Maccabi Sheli.

As of 2020, Maccabi Healthcare Services is the second largest Kupat Holim in Israel, with almost 2.4 million members, and is considered an influential institution in regards to the Israeli healthcare system. Maccabi members benefit from diverse health services, using expert personnel in all medical and paramedical fields as well as a network of specialized institutes ho perform diagnostics and treatments, including Assuta. Maccabi’s service methodology is based on free choice of physician.

The Maccabi Committee, chief governing body of Maccabi, holds elections  every 4 years.

History
Maccabi Fund for the Ill was founded in 1940 as an association affiliated with the Maccabi Eretz Yisrael movement. Maccabi Eretz Yisrael was an a-political movement with a liberal worldview, in contrast to the collaborative ethos of the Labor movement. Maccabi began with a staff of ten doctors. Amongst the founding fathers were: Dr. Felix Theilhaber, Dr. Ernest Freudenthal, Peretz Bernstein, Uri Nadav, Dr. Avigdor Koren, George Flash, Dr. Eliahu Sedgar, Hananya Berger, Dr. Moshe Harnik, Dr. Eliezer Ludwig Lehrfreund, Dr. Robert Atlas, Arthur Rosenberg, Fritz Levinzon, Dr. Herman Lelewer. Most of them were doctors, while others dealt with administration and finances.

The founders were headed by two co-managers: Dr. Felix Theilhaber, who came up with ideas and preached for their execution, and Dr. Ernest Freudenthal, who carried them out. Dr. Theilhaber served as the HMO’s lead physician and chairman until his death in 1956. Dr. Freudenthal headed the HMO as its CEO and later chairman until he died in 1982.

When Maccabi started out most of its doctors were originally from central Europe. They brought along liberal work methods, centered around the member’s freedom of choice of physician and institution. The work was conducted by a few employees and independent physicians who were compensated in accordance with their work. Maccabi’s goal was to provide public medicine with the quality of private medicine.
During the first years Maccabi branches only operated in central Israel: Tel Aviv-Yafo, Ramat Gan, Holon, Bat Yam and Kfar Shemaryahu. The main obstacle in the HMO’s path was difficulties imposed by the Israel Medical Association, especially in Jerusalem, but elsewhere as well. Maccabi’s breakthrough towards country-wide distribution was in 1977 as Dr. Pinchas Nagel replaces Dr. Freudenthal as CEO, when the latter became chairman of the board.

When Dr. Freudenthal died in 1982 Sarah Doron was elected as chairwoman of the board. When she retired in 2010 Prof. Moshe Revah was elected to replace her. Prof. Revah had extensive experience in management of healthcare systems, as he had formerly been the head medical officer in the IDF and the manager of Rambam hospital in Haifa. Mrs. Doron was awarded the title “Honorary President” of Maccabi, a title she carried while continuing to operate within Maccabi until her death.

The leap in Maccabi’s popularity began in 1990. By 1995, the HMO had quintupled its membership to over one million. In 1994 Maccabi had another significant milestone when it purchased Assuta hospital, later to be united with the Ramat Marpe hospital. Together, they perform approximately one eighth of the surgeries in Israel.

The 10th Maccabi Conference took place in 2000, and indicated positive trends in the HMO’s development. The HMO had 1.46 million members at the time, and increased its share from 19.9% to 22.6% of the population (the largest increase of any HMO). Surveys conducted among members of all HMOs showed Maccabi with the highest satisfaction rate.

In 2005, Maccabi began conducting medical research, increased the activities of Assuta, and established Maccabi Holdings in which its subsidiaries are managed. Prof. Ehud Kokia was appointed to manager of the health division in 2005, and to CEO in 2007. Prof. Kokia led strategic moves to empower the members, improve service and reduce the inequality in the Israeli healthcare system.
As of 2017, the chairman of the board is Professor Moshe Revah, and since 2011, the CEO has been Ran Sa’ar. Heading the health division since 2014 is Professor Nachman Ash, who replaced Professor Avi Porat.

Programs and Services

Maccabi Healthcare Services provides its members with a variety of healthcare services, through the HMO itself, which is a nonprofit organization, as well as through its various subsidiaries.

Maccabi’s services are based upon the Israeli National Health Services Basket and the Maccabi Services Basket (an extension of the National Health Services Basket). Maccabi members can benefit from additional paid coverage through the Additional Health Services. Maccabi has three levels of Additional Health Services on offer: Maccabi Silver, Maccabi Gold, and Maccabi Sheli.

In addition to insurance programs meant for Israeli residents Maccabi also has a unique program meant for foreign citizens as well as returning Israeli citizens.

Amongst Maccabi’s divisions and subsidiaries are:
 Maccabi Pharm – Over 90 pharmacies across the country.
 Maccabi Care – A private label, includes various healthcare products sold at Maccabi Pharm.
 Maccabi Tivi – Complementary medicine clinics offering a unique combination of body and soul treatments under medical supervision.
 MaccabiDent – Dental clinics also servicing members of other HMOs.
 Maccabi at First Sight – A chain of about 100 optometry stores.
 Assuta Medical Centers – Medical centers, including four hospitals as well as several clinics and medical institutes.
 Bayit Balev – Assisted living chain for the elderly, including nursing care wards.
 Beity – Home-care services for the elderly.
 Beside these, Maccabi also operates projects for its members’ welfare:
 The Maccabi Fund – An association providing financial assistance, loans, scholarships and welfare services.
 Maccabi Shefa – A consumer club aiming to promote healthy products.
Maccabi conducts unique medical research and development through the Maccabi Institute for Health Services Research, the Clinical Research unit, MaccabiTech (epidemiological research) and participation in technological incubators in the medical field.
Maccabi gives back to the community via a project collecting old medicines for recycling, as well as through maintaining a thorough portal of medical information in the Hebrew language.

References

External links
 Maccabi Website
 Assuta Websites

Health maintenance organizations
Medical and health organizations based in Israel
Organizations established in 1941
1941 establishments in Mandatory Palestine